Hessy Doris Lloyd (3 July 1891 – 21 May 1968) was an English–American film and stage actress. She is perhaps best known for her roles in The Time Machine (1960) and The Sound of Music (1965). Lloyd appeared in two Academy Award winners and four other nominees.

Early life
Lloyd's parents were Edward Franklin Lloyd and Hessy Jane McCappin. She was born in Liverpool, and she had a grandfather who was an amateur actor. Her father was born in 1855, in Holywell, Flintshire. Her mother was born in 1860.

Career
When Lloyd was 23, she debuted on stage with the Liverpool Repertory Company. She appeared a number of times in the London West End, including in  Mr. Todd's Experiment by Walter C. Hackett (Queen's Theatre, 1920), and The Smiths of Surbiton by Keble Howard (New Theatre, 1922). Her film debut was in the 1920 British silent film The Shadow Between.

She went to the United States to visit a sister already living there. What was supposed to be a visit she made permanent. She spent several years (1916–25) appearing in Broadway theatre plays, notably a number of Ziegfeld Follies editions, and probably spent some time on the road in touring companies. She decided on a film career, making her first US film in 1925. With the exception of returning to one Broadway play in 1947, her career was devoted to films and television.

Roles

Lloyd appeared in more than 150 films in a 42 year career between 1925 and 1967, including the 1933 low-budget Monogram Pictures version of Oliver Twist, in which she played Nancy. Irving Pichel starred as Fagin and Dickie Moore as Oliver. Her roles ranged from the sinister Russian spy Mrs. Travers in the biopic Disraeli (1929) to the meek housekeeper Mrs. Watchett in The Time Machine (1960).

Her most famous film roles were in the Tarzan films starring Johnny Weissmuller. She portrayed a nurse in Frankenstein Meets the Wolf Man (1943) with Lon Chaney Jr. as the Wolf Man and Bela Lugosi as Frankenstein's monster. She voiced one of the roses in Disney's Alice in Wonderland (1951), later making small appearances in Mary Poppins and The Sound of Music, which both starred Julie Andrews.

Death
Lloyd died on 21 May 1968, aged 76, in Santa Barbara, California. She is interred in Glendale's Forest Lawn Memorial Park Cemetery.

Selected filmography

 The Shadow Between (1920) as Marian West
 Love's Influence (1922)
 The Lady (1925) as Fannie Chair
 The Man from Red Gulch (1925) as Madame Le Blanc
 The Blackbird (1926) as Limehouse Polly
 Brown of Harvard (1926) as Nurse (uncredited)
 Black Paradise (1926) as Lillian Webster
 The Midnight Kiss (1926) as Ellen Atkins
 Exit Smiling (1926) as Olga
 The Auctioneer (1927) as Esther Levi
 The Broncho Twister (1927) as Teresa Brady
 Is Zat So? (1927) as Sue Parker
 Rich But Honest (1927) as Mrs. O'Grady
 Lonesome Ladies (1927) as Helen Wayne
 Two Girls Wanted (1927) as Mrs. Timoney
 Come to My House (1927) as Renee Parsons
 The Trail of '98 (1928) as Locasto's procurer
 The Drake Case (1929) as Mrs. Drake
 The Careless Age (1929) as Mabs
 Disraeli (1929) as Mrs. Travers
 Sarah and Son (1930) as Mrs. Ashmore, Vanning's sister
 Our Blushing Brides (1930) as Miss Hartley - Head of Lingerie Department (uncredited)
 Old English (1930) as Mrs. Rosamond Lane
 Reno (1930) as Lola Fealey
 Way for a Sailor (1930) as Flossy
 Charley's Aunt (1930) as Donna Lucia D'Alvadorez
 The Bachelor Father (1931) as Mrs. Julia Webb
 Transgression (1931) as Paula Vrain
 Bought! (1931) as Mrs. Barry
 Waterloo Bridge (1931) as Kitty
 Devotion (1931) as Pansy
 Once a Lady (1931) as Lady Ellen Somerville
 Tarzan the Ape Man (1932) as Mrs. Cutten
 The Washington Masquerade (1932) as Dinner Guest (uncredited)
 Back Street (1932) as Corinne Saxel - Walter's wife
 Payment Deferred (1932) as Woman Exchanging Foreign Currency in Bank (uncredited)
 A Farewell to Arms (1932) as Nurse (uncredited)
 Robbers' Roost (1932) as Prossie (uncredited)
 Oliver Twist (1933) as Nancy Sikes
 Secrets (1933) as Susan Channing
 Looking Forward (1933) as Mrs. Lil Benton
 A Study in Scarlet (1933) as Mrs. Murphy
 Peg o' My Heart (1933) as Mrs. Grace Brent
 Voltaire (1933) as Mme. Clarion - Actress
 Long Lost Father (1934) as Mrs. Bellwater - The Blonde Widow
 Glamour (1934) as Nana
 Sisters Under the Skin (1934) as Elinor Yates
 Madame Du Barry (1934) as Madame of Dear Park (uncredited)
 Kiss and Make-Up (1934) as Mme. Durand
 She Was a Lady (1934) as Alice Vane
 One Exciting Adventure (1934) as Customer
 British Agent (1934) as Lady Carrister
 Dangerous Corner (1934) as Maude Mockridge
 Strange Wives (1934) as Mrs. Sleeper
 The Man Who Reclaimed His Head (1934) as Lulu - Woman in Theatre Box (uncredited)
 Tarzan and His Mate (1934) as Mrs. Cutten (deleted scenes)
 Clive of India (1935) as Mrs. Nixon
 A Shot in the Dark (1935) as Lucille Coates
 The Woman in Red (1935) as Mrs. Casserly
 Straight from the Heart (1935) as Miss Carter
 Chasing Yesterday (1935) as Mme. De Gabry (uncredited)
 Motive for Revenge (1935) as Mrs. Fleming
 Becky Sharp (1935) as Duchess of Richmond
 Two for Tonight (1935) as Lady Ralston (uncredited)
 A Feather in Her Hat (1935) as Liz Vining
 Peter Ibbetson (1935) as Mrs. Dorian
 Mutiny on the Bounty (1935) as Cockney Moll (uncredited)
 The Perfect Gentleman (1935) as Kate
 Kind Lady (1935) as Lucy Weston
 Don't Get Personal (1936) as Mrs. Charles van Ronesoleer
 Follow the Fleet (1936) as Mrs. Courtney (uncredited)
 Too Many Parents (1936) as Mrs. Downing
 Brilliant Marriage (1936) as Mrs. Madeleine Allison
 Mary of Scotland (1936) as Fisherman's wife
 The Luckiest Girl in the World (1936) (uncredited)
 A Woman Rebels (1936) as Mrs. Seaton - at Party (uncredited)
 The Plough and the Stars (1936) as Woman at barricades
 Bulldog Drummond Escapes (1937) as Nurse
 The Soldier and the Lady (1937) as Shepherdess (uncredited)
 Alcatrez Island (1937) as Miss Marquand
 Tovarich (1937) as Madame Chauffourier-Dubleff
 Murder Is News (1937) as Pauline Drake
 The Black Doll (1938) as Laura Leland
 The Baroness and the Butler (1938) as Lady at Charity Party (uncredited)
 Lord Jeff (1938) as Hostess of Party (uncredited)
 Port of Seven Seas (1938) as Customer (uncredited)
 Letter of Introduction (1938) as Charlotte in Play (uncredited)
 They Made Me a Criminal (1939) as Mrs. Williamson (uncredited)
 Three Smart Girls Grow Up (1939) as Guest (uncredited)
 I'm from Missouri (1939) as Mrs. Arthur, Duchess of Cricklewood
 The Spellbinder (1939) as Mrs. Raymond - School Headmistress (uncredited)
 Chicken Wagon Family (1939) as Mrs. McGinty (uncredited)
 The Old Maid (1939) as Miss Ford (uncredited)
 The Under-Pup (1939) as Mrs. Binns
 The Private Lives of Elizabeth and Essex (1939) as Handmaiden (uncredited)
 Intermezzo (1939) as Schoolteacher at Accident Scene (uncredited)
 First Love (1939) as Mrs. Parker
 We Are Not Alone (1939) as Mrs. Jaeggers (uncredited)
 Barricade (1939) as Mrs. Ward
 Vigil in the Night (1940) as Mrs. Martha Bowley
 'Til We Meet Again (1940) as Louise
 The Boys from Syracuse (1940) as Woman
 Life with Henry (1940) as Mrs. Anderson (uncredited)
 The Letter (1940) as Mrs. Cooper
 Lady with Red Hair (1940) as Teacher at Miss Humbert's School (uncredited)
 The Great Plane Robbery (1940) as Mrs. Jamison
 Scotland Yard (1941) as Miss Harcourt - Nurse (uncredited)
 The Great Lie (1941) as Bertha - Sandra's Maid (uncredited)
 Shining Victory (1941) as Mrs. Foster
 Dr. Jekyll and Mr. Hyde (1941) as Mrs. Marley (uncredited)
 International Squadron (1941) as Mother (uncredited)
 Appointment for Love (1941) as Woman Spectator (uncredited)
 Keep 'Em Flying (1941) as Lady with Lipstick (uncredited)
 The Wolf Man (1941) as Mrs. Williams (uncredited)
 On the Sunny Side (1942) as Mrs. Whitaker (uncredited)
 The Ghost of Frankenstein (1942) as Martha
 This Above All (1942) as WAAF Sergeant (uncredited)
 Night Monster (1942) as Sarah Judd
 Journey for Margaret (1942) as Mrs. Barrie
 Forever and a Day (1943) as Trimble Maid
 No Place for a Lady (1943) as Evelyn Harris
 Frankenstein Meets the Wolf Man (1943) as Dr. Mannering's Nurse (uncredited)
 Mission to Moscow (1943) as Mrs. Churchill (uncredited)
 Two Tickets to London (1943) as Emmie (uncredited)
 The Constant Nymph (1943) as Miss Hamilton
 Flesh and Fantasy (1943) as Mrs. Carrington (uncredited)
 What a Woman! (1943) as Drama Coach (uncredited)
 The Lodger (1944) as Jennie
 Phantom Lady (1944) as Kettisha
 Follow the Boys (1944) as Nurse (uncredited)
 The White Cliffs of Dover (1944) as Plump Lady at Boardinghouse (uncredited)
 The Invisible Man's Revenge (1944) as Maud
 Frenchman's Creek (1944) as Minor Role (uncredited)
 The Conspirators (1944) as Mrs. Benson (uncredited)
 The House of Fear (1945) as Bessie (uncredited)
 Molly and Me (1945) as Mrs. Graham
 Scotland Yard Investigator (1945) as Emma Todworthy
 Kitty (1945) as Fishhawker (uncredited)
 My Name Is Julia Ross (1945) as Mrs. Mackie
 Allotment Wives (1945) as Alice Van Brook
 Three Strangers (1946) as Mrs. Proctor
 Tarzan and the Leopard Woman (1946) as Miss Wetherby, School Superintendent (uncredited)
 To Each His Own (1946) as Miss Pringle
 Devotion (1946) as Mrs. Ingraham (uncredited)
 Of Human Bondage (1946) as Landlady
 G.I. War Brides (1946) as Beatrice Moraski
 Holiday in Mexico (1946) as Cady Millicent Owen (uncredited)
 Sister Kenny (1946) as Matron (uncredited)
 The Imperfect Lady (1947) as Woman in Theater Balcony (uncredited)
 The Secret Life of Walter Mitty (1947) as Mrs. Leticia Follinebee
 Escape Me Never (1947) as Mrs. Cooper (uncredited)
 The Sign of the Ram (1948) as Mrs. Woolton (uncredited)
 The Red Danube (1949) as Mrs. Omicron (uncredited)
 Challenge to Lassie (1949) as Landlady (uncredited)
 Adam's Rib (1949) as Lady with Attinger Kids in Court (uncredited)
 Tyrant of the Sea (1950) as Elizabeth Blake
 Kind Lady (1951) as Rose
 Alice in Wonderland (1951) as Rose (voice)
 The Son of Dr. Jekyll (1951) as Lottie Sorelle (uncredited)
 The Prisoner of Zenda (1952) as Lady Topham (uncredited)
 Young Bess (1953) as Mother Jack
 The Black Shield of Falworth (1954) as Dame Ellen
 A Man Called Peter (1955) as Miss Hopkins (uncredited)
 Interrupted Melody (1955) as Volunteer Worker (uncredited)
 The Swan (1956) as Countess Sibenstoyn
 Jeanne Eagels (1957) as Mrs. Corliss (uncredited)
 Alfred Hitchcock Presents (1958-1962, TV Series) as Mrs. Boyd / Nannie / Gun Store Customer / Miss Wilkinson / Emily's Mother
 The Time Machine (1960) as Mrs. Watchett
 Midnight Lace (1960) as Nora Stanley, the Housekeeper
 The Notorious Landlady as Lady Fallott
Thriller (1960) as Edith Pringle
 Mary Poppins (1964) as Depositor (uncredited)
 The Sound of Music (1965) as Baroness Ebberfeld
 Rosie! (1967) as Sedalia

References

External links

1891 births
1968 deaths
British expatriate actresses in the United States
English film actresses
English silent film actresses
English television actresses
English voice actresses
Actresses from Liverpool
Burials at Forest Lawn Memorial Park (Glendale)
20th-century English actresses
20th-century British businesspeople